John Lindsley may refer to:

 John Berrien Lindsley (1822–1897), American minister
 John Lindsley (trade unionist) (1889–?), British trade unionist and political activist